Roudkunda  is a village in the Sindhanur taluk of Raichur district in the southern state of Karnataka, India.
Roudkunda is famous for Ranganatha swamy temple. Roudkunda is surrounded by hills and there is an ancient fort on the hill top belonging to 16th century.  There are various relics found in the hills that have historical importance.
Roudkunda is 18 km south to the taluka headquarters Sindhanur and 5 km from Karnataka State Highway 23.  Nearest towns are Siruguppa and Karatagi.

Demographics
 India census, Roudkunda had a population of 7982 with 3960 males and 4022 females.

See also
 Salagunda
 Mukkunda
 Maski
 Kanakagiri
 Raichur
 Raichur
 Districts of Karnataka

References

External links
 http://Raichur.nic.in/

Villages in Raichur district